Aglyptinus is a genus of round fungus beetles in the family Leiodidae. There is one described species in Aglyptinus, A. laevis.

References

Further reading

 
 

Leiodidae
Articles created by Qbugbot